Par Noussss Touss Les Trous de Vos Crânes! is the second album of Et Sans. It was released in April 2005 by Alien8 Recordings, their first album on the record label.

The album is composed of four tracks, of which three go above the ten-minute mark. The titles of the tracks are semi-sensical French sentences, and in several cases, spaces between words are deliberately misplaced or absent. It was recorded after expanding the band by recruiting Felix Morel, Sophie Trudeau, and Stephen de Oliveira for various instrumental purposes.

Track listing

 "La Chose Nue Nue Nue du l'Amoncellement Spectral du Mal" – 5:22
 "Une Bouche Végétale, Des Créatures Soufflent des Sécrétions du Tout Fout le Camp" – 18:45
 "Mademoiselle Ogive, Un Tremblement Osseux dans le Derrière" – 10:12
 "Les Courbes Sanglantes Entendues de l'Organe Trop Vraíment Halluciné" – 11:19

Personnel

Et Sans

 Roger Tellier-Craig – vocals, farfisa, maxi-korg, digital arrangements
 Alexandre St-Onge – vocals, electronics, bass
 Stephen de Oliveira – vocals, electronics (tracks 1 & 2)
 Sophie Trudeau – vocals (tracks 2 & 3), violin (track 2)
 Felix Morel – drums (tracks 2 & 4)

Technical

 Harris Newman – engineer
 Thierry Amar – engineer, mixing

Notes

External links
 Alien8 Recordings Official Homepage

2005 albums
Alien8 Recordings albums
Et Sans albums